Rasolo was a Fijian High Chief.

Family 
Father of Rasolo was Chief Niumataiwalu of Lakeba. Rasolo's mother was Lady Tarau of Tovu Totoya. Rasolo was a brother of Lady Sivoki and Uluilakeba I and half-brother of Matawalu.

Rasolo's first wife was Lady Laufitu. Their son was Roko Malani.

Rasolo's second wife was from Lakeba. She bore Soroaqali and Lalaciwa to Rasolo. Lady Radavu was the third wife of Rasolo. She bore him Taliai Tupou.

Biography 
Rasolo became the third Roko Sau of the Lau Islands and first installed holder of the title Tu'i Nayau. According to the oral history, Rasolo was exiled to Nayau.

He is considered to be the progenitor of the noble households Matailakeba and Vatuwaqa.

It was under the rule of Rasolo that the invading Bauan forces were driven from Lakeba.

References 

Fijian chiefs
People from Lakeba
Tui Nayau
Vuanirewa